White Rock Pier is a  pier in White Rock, British Columbia. Originally built in 1914, it was a dock for steamships that arrived when the Great Northern Railway began operation. On December 20, 2018, the pier was severely damaged during a wind storm. It is estimated that the cost to rebuild the pier is $16.2 million.
The pier was repaired and reopened in 2019. It is often erroneously claimed to be Canada's longest pier. However, there are several longer piers in Canada, the longest of which is the Quai de Portneuf in Portneuf, Quebec.

Gallery

References

Piers in Canada
White Rock, British Columbia